Nils Larsen (19 June 1900 – 29 September 1976) was a Norwegian sea captain. Larsen is perhaps most associated with the Norvegia expeditions of Antarctica.

Larsen was born in Sandar, and became a noted whaler, captaining a number of whaling ships principally for Thor Dahl A/S of Sandefjord.
He also served as a first mate on  Norvegia expeditions of Antarctica financed by Norwegian whale-ship owner Lars Christensen. 
During these expeditions, Norway achieved annexation of Bouvet Island (1927) and Peter I Island (1929).

Larsen died in Sandefjord, at the age of 76. Geographical areas in Antarctica named after him include: Mount Nils Larsen (Queen Maud Land), Mount Nils (Enderby Land) and Nils Larsen Glacier (Peter I Island).

References

1900 births
1976 deaths
People from Sandefjord
Norwegian sailors
Norwegian people in whaling
20th-century Norwegian people
Sportspeople from Vestfold og Telemark